Shaun Robinson (born July 12, 1962) is an American television host, author, producer, philanthropist, television personality and actress. She is perhaps best known for hosting Access Hollywood (1999–2015) and 90 Day Fiancé and its spin-offs (2016–present). Her accolades include an Emmy Award for her live coverage of A Grand Night in Harlem for the Black Sports and Entertainment Hall of Fame.

Early life

Shaun Robinson was born on July 12, 1962 in Detroit, Michigan. She has a brother and two sisters. She is a graduate of Cass Technical High School. She then moved to Atlanta to attend Spelman College.

Career
Robinson's career began in Detroit at WGPR-TV (now WWJ-TV), the first African-American owned television station in the U.S. After that Robinson was a medical reporter and weekend anchor for WISN-TV in Milwaukee, Wisconsin, where her series on women and cancer garnered her an Associated Press award. She also served as host of the daily talk show Milwaukee's Talking. Robinson later joined newly formed KEYE-TV in Austin, Texas, in 1995, as a reporter and anchor where her series "Profiles in Power", focusing on women who made an impact in Central Texas, earned Robinson an American Women in Radio and Television award. In 1999, she started working as a weekend anchor and correspondent for Access Hollywood, a job that eventually lasted for 16 years.

Before joining Access Hollywood, Robinson was a reporter and anchor for WSVN-TV in Miami, Florida. During her tenure there, Robinson anchored coverage of both the Clinton impeachment hearings and of Hurricane George, which devastated the Florida Keys. She traveled to Oklahoma to profile survivors of the Oklahoma City bombing. She filled in for Meredith Vieira on Who Wants to Be a Millionaire for the week of June 8–12, 2009. She has contributed reports to television shows NBC Nightly News and Today.

In October 2010, Robinson was a guest star on a celebrity edition episode of the game show Don't Forget the Lyrics. She played and won $10,000 for her selected charity, Girls, Inc. Robinson co-hosted the NBC coverage of the Tournament of Roses Parade with Al Roker in 2011 and 2012. She has provided coverage for the Academy Awards, Golden Globes, Emmy Awards and Grammy Awards. In 2016, Robinson began hosting Tell All specials for TLC’s 90 Day Fiancé and its spin-offs. In 2019, Robinson landed the role of Kris Kensington on BET’s Games People Play. In February 2020, Forbes published an article about Robinson as part of the magazine's an ongoing series "The Secrets of Successful Women."

Her first book titled Exactly As I Am: Celebrated Women Share Candid Advice with Today’s Girls on What it Takes to Believe in Yourself was published on March 31, 2009 by Ballantine Books. The book of motivational advice and anecdotes presents quotes and stories from role models notable for confidence, determination and generosity. The book inspires girls to find their inner strength, become confident, and believe in themselves.

Personal life
In 1994, Robinson married MLB player Darryl Hamilton, but they later divorced.

Philanthropy 
Robinson has launched a nonprofit organization to help empower girls and young women. The S.H.A.U.N. Foundation for Girls supports small charities that are doing work in five key areas of girls issues: (S)TEM, (H)EALTH, (A)RTS, (U)NITY and (N)EIGHBORHOODS. Robinson and her foundation have been featured on the CBS show, Hidden Heroes.

Filmography

As actress

As herself

References

External links
 

1962 births
Living people
Actresses from Detroit
African-American actresses
American film actresses
American infotainers
American television journalists
American television talk show hosts
Cass Technical High School alumni
Television anchors from Miami
Spelman College alumni